Manzanita Lake is a lake located in Lassen Volcanic National Park. The name means "little apple" in Spanish.

Manzanita Lake was formed when Manzanita Creek was dammed 300 years ago by a rock avalanche from the northwest slope of the Chaos Crags, which also resulted in the debris formation known as Chaos Jumbles.

The area around the lake features the Loomis Museum, a campground, and the Manzanita Lake Naturalist's Services Historic District. Located near the park entrance, the lake is open for fishing and has rainbow, brown and brook trout.

Climate
Manzanita Lake has a warm-summer humid continental climate (Dsb) using the 0 °C isotherm or a warm-summer mediterranean climate (Csb) using the -3 °C isotherm with short, warm summers and cool winters, with most precipitation falling in the winter months.

Gallery

See also
List of lakes in California

References

External links

Lakes of Lassen Volcanic National Park
Lakes of Shasta County, California
Lakes of California
Lakes of Northern California